Ali Molaei (born 1984) is an Iranian football midfielder who currently plays for Fajr Sepasi in Iran Pro League.

On January 1, 2008, Molaei was banned from playing professional football for two years for doping.

Club career
He had two seasons with Mes, but the Iranian federation charged him with doping and banned him from playing for two years.

Club career statistics

 Assist Goals

Honours

Club
Iran's Premier Football League
Winner: 1
2009/10 with Sepahan

References

 Iran Premier League Stats

Iranian footballers
Association football midfielders
Sanat Mes Kerman F.C. players
People from Ahvaz
1984 births
Living people
Sepahan S.C. footballers
Tractor S.C. players
Mes Sarcheshme players
Gostaresh Foulad F.C. players
Fajr Sepasi players
Saba players
Iranian sportspeople in doping cases
Sportspeople from Khuzestan province